The Pakistani cricket team toured New Zealand in November 2016 to play two Test matches and a three-day first-class match. Christchurch and Hamilton were the venues scheduled to host the two Test matches.

The first Test of the series went ahead as planned on 17 November, despite Christchurch suffering a 7.8 magnitude earthquake, just after midnight on 14 November. However, no play was possible on the first day due to rain.

New Zealand won the series 2–0. This was New Zealand's first series win against Pakistan in Tests since 1985.

Squads

Azhar Ali was appointed Pakistan's captain for the second Test after Misbah-ul-Haq left the tour after the death of his father-in-law. Misbah-ul-Haq was later given a one-match suspension by the International Cricket Council (ICC) for Pakistan's slow over rate in the first Test, and he would have missed the second Test because of this. Mitchell Santner replaced James Neesham in New Zealand's squad ahead of the second Test. Trent Boult was ruled out of the second Test with a knee injury and was replaced by Doug Bracewell.

Tour match

First-class: New Zealand A vs Pakistanis

Test series

1st Test

2nd Test

References

External links
 Series home at ESPN Cricinfo

2016 in Pakistani cricket
2016 in New Zealand cricket
International cricket competitions in 2016–17
Pakistani cricket tours of New Zealand